Viktor Tegelhoff (22 December 1918 – 11 September 1991) was a Slovak football player. He played for club ŠK Slovan Bratislava.

References

External links

Viktor Tegelhoff's profile

1918 births
1991 deaths
Slovak people of German descent
Slovak footballers
Czechoslovak footballers
Czechoslovakia international footballers
ŠK Slovan Bratislava players
Slovakia international footballers
Dual internationalists (football)
Association football forwards
Sportspeople from Ružomberok